Willie "Bill" Jefferson (January 27, 1904 – May 31, 1972)was an American baseball pitcher in the Negro leagues.

A native of Clearview, Oklahoma, Jefferson was the brother of Jeff Jefferson, also played in the Negro leagues. Jefferson played with several teams from 1937 to 1948, spending the majority of his career with the Cleveland Buckeyes. He was the starting pitcher for the Buckeyes when they made it to the 1945 Negro World Series, starting Game 1 against the two-time defending champion Homestead Grays. He threw a complete game while allowing just six hits and one earned run while striking out four and walking two batters in a 2–1 win, and the Buckeyes would ultimately sweep the Grays in four games.

He served in the US Army during World War II, and died in Houston, Texas in 1976 at age 71 or 72.

References

External links
 and Seamheads

1904 births
1976 deaths
Cincinnati Crescents players
Cleveland Buckeyes players
Louisville Buckeyes players
Memphis Red Sox players
Baseball players from Oklahoma
United States Army personnel of World War II
20th-century African-American sportspeople
Baseball pitchers